Thomas Wharton (born 25 February 1963) is a Canadian novelist.

Life

Born in Grande Prairie, Alberta, Wharton attended the University of Alberta and the University of Calgary. He was a student of Rudy Wiebe and Greg Hollingshead. His first novel began as his M.A. thesis, under the supervision of Kristjana Gunnars. He worked on his PhD at Calgary with Aritha van Herk.  Wharton is currently an associate professor of writing and English at the University of Alberta in Edmonton, and head of the creative writing program.

Writing and awards

Wharton's first book, Icefields (1995), was awarded the "Best First Book" in the Canada and Caribbean division of the Commonwealth Writers Prize, the Writers Guild of Alberta's "Best First Book Award", and the Banff Mountain Book Festival Grand Prize. Icefields was a finalist in the Canada Reads competition in early 2008.

His second book, Salamander (2002), won the Georges Bugnet Award for Fiction and was short-listed for the Governor General's Award for Fiction, and the Grant MacEwan Author's Award (2002). It was also a finalist for the Rogers Writers' Trust Fiction Prize.

The Logogryph was short listed for the International Dublin Literary Award.

Wharton has published a three-volume fantasy novel for younger readers, The Perilous Realm. The three books are The Shadow of Malabron (2008), The Fathomless Fire (2012), and The Tree of Story (2013), published by Doubleday Canada and Walker/Candlewick (US/UK).

Wharton's most recent book is the self-published novel Every Blade of Grass (2014), the story of a decades-long correspondence between a man and woman who share a love for the wonders and oddities of nature.

Bibliography
Icefields. Edmonton: NeWest Press, 1995 
Salamander. Toronto: McClelland & Stewart, 2001 
The Logogryph: A Bibliography of Imaginary Books. Kentville, Nova Scotia: Gaspereau Press, 2004 
The Shadow of Malabron: Book One of The Perilous Realm. Toronto: Doubleday, 2008. London: Walker Books, 2008
"The Fathomless Fire: Book Two of The Perilous Realm". Toronto: Doubleday, 2012
The Tree of Story: Book Three of the Perilous Realm. Toronto: Doubleday, 2013

References

External links
 Author's Website
 Selected Bibliography for Thomas Wharton at Athabasca University
 NeWest Press: Thomas Wharton Bio
 Macleans: Magic and real life
 Captain Marvel,  Quill & Quire Author Profile:

1963 births
Canadian male novelists
Living people